Oued Tlélat is a district in Oran Province, Algeria, one of the two landlocked districts of the province. It was named after its capital, Oued Tlélat.

Municipalities
The district is further divided into 4 municipalities:
Oued Tlélat
El Braya
Boufatis
Tafraoui

Districts of Oran Province